The Kilmaluag Formation is a Middle Jurassic geologic formation in Scotland. It was formerly known as the Ostracod Limestone for the abundance of fossil freshwater ostracods within it. The Kilmaluag Formation is very fossiliferous, with ostracods, gastropods, bivalves, trace fossil burrows, and vertebrate fossil remains. Vertebrate fossils include fish, crocodylomorphs, mammals, small reptiles, amphibians and some large reptile remains including dinosaurs and pterosaurs.

Geology
The Kilmaluag Formation is Bathonian, and dates to around 167 million years old. It is part of the Great Estuarine Group of the Hebrides Basin, a series of sediments laid down as the land rose and fell in the area running between what is now mainland Scotland the Outer Hebrides, causing the environment to alternate between a warm shallow sea and more exposed dry land and lagoons.

The Kilmaluag Formation is composed of dolomitised limestones, fine grain sandstones, and mudstones, indicating that it alternated between a shallow environment, and lagoonal mudflats as the basin subsided and rose.  These mudflats sometimes dried out to form desiccation cracks. The Kilmaluag Formation is unusual among the Estuarine Group for the freshwater environment it preserves, whereas many other formations in this group are predominantly brackish to marine in nature. In many beds, freshwater gastropods and bivalves can be found, including Viviparus and Unio, and freshwater ostracods such as Darwinula.

Fossils
Many vertebrate fossils are found in the Kilmaluag Formation, and it has been explored by palaeontologists since the 1970s, when the first mammal fossil was found there by Michael Waldman. He returned with fellow palaeontologist Robert Savage and they collected more fossils and named two new species from the area: the Docodont Borealestes serendipitus, and the tritylodontid, 
Stereognathus hebridicus (although S. hebridicus is now thought to be a junior synonym to S. ooliticus). Many other fossils are found in the Kilmaluag, including members of other Mesozoic mammal groups, turtles, reptiles, and amphibians. The most recent discoveries in the Kilmaluag Formation include Palaeoxonodon ooliticus and Wareolestes rex. and the tooth of a sauropod dinosaur.

Comparisons between the Kilmaluag Formation and other sites in the UK and rest of the world suggest that the fauna represented there is globally significant, due to the rarity of fossils from the Middle Jurassic. The fauna is a subset of the animals represented in the Forest Marble Formation in England, but fossils in the Kilmaliag Formation are substantially more complete. However, most material can only be studied using micro-CT scanning making it difficult to collect and study. 

Exposures of the Kilmaluag Formation are protected by law as SSSIs (Site of Special Scientific Interest) and under the new Scottish NCO (Nature Conservation Order), and no public collection is permitted. Most fossils found to date are held in the collections of the National Museum of Scotland.

Vertebrate paleobiota

Amphibians

Turtles

Lepidosauromorphs

Choristoderes

Dinosaurs

Mammaliamorphs

See also 
 List of fossiliferous stratigraphic units in Scotland

References 

Geologic formations of Scotland
Jurassic Scotland
Bathonian Stage
Marl formations
Lagoonal deposits
Paleontology in Scotland